Eye on the Ball is a 2019 Malaysian sports documentary film. It tells the true story of Malaysia's national blind football team, and their journey in the 2017 ASEAN Para Games. It was released at Astro First on 20 August 2020.

Synopsis 
The documentary follows Malaysia's national blind football team, known as Harimau Buta (Blind Tigers), and details the lives of four individuals: players Asri, Kenchot and Rollen, along with their coach, Sunny Shalesh. After winning gold in the 2015 ASEAN Para Games, the team hopes to defend their championships title in the 2017 ASEAN Para Games and also qualify for the World Blind Football Championships.

Cast 
Sunny Shalesh, coach
Asri Arshad, player
Azwan Azhar, player
Rollen Maraki, player

See also 

 Football 5-a-side at the 2017 ASEAN Para Games
 Football 7-a-side at the 2017 ASEAN Para Games
 Football 5-a-side at the 2015 ASEAN Para Games
 Football 7-a-side at the 2015 ASEAN Para Games

References

External links 
 

Malaysian documentary films
2019 films
Malaysian sports films
2019 documentary films